The Varaiya are a Jain community with origins in the Gujarat, India. This community is part of Digambar Jain sect. 

A notable leader in Varaiya Jain community was Gopaldas Varaiya. 

Varaiya is also a surname. Notable people with the surname may or may not be affiliated with Jain community include:

Hiren Varaiya (born 1984), Kenyan cricketer
Pravin Varaiya (born 1940), American electrical engineer